"It's a Little Too Late" is a song written by Roger Murrah and Pat Terry, and recorded by American country music singer Tanya Tucker.  It was released in January 1993 as the second single from her album Can't Run from Yourself.  It peaked at number 2 on the Hot Country Singles & Tracks (now Hot Country Songs) chart in March, behind George Strait's "Heartland". It also reached number 12 on the Bubbling Under Hot 100.

Critical reception
Mario Tarradell of The Miami Herald gave Can't Run from Yourself a favorable review, noting this single as being "all attitude" and "rocking".

Charts

Weekly charts

Year-end charts

References

1993 singles
1992 songs
Tanya Tucker songs
Songs written by Roger Murrah
Liberty Records singles
Song recordings produced by Jerry Crutchfield